The Tight Connection is the second album from I Am the World Trade Center the New York City based synthpop band. The album was released in 2002 and it contains covers of The Stone Roses' "Shoot You Down" and Blondie's "Call Me."

Track listing
 "The Postcard" – 2:48
 "Big Star" – 2:58
 "Believe In Me" – 3:26
 "Shoot You Down" – 4:35
 "Pretty Baby" – 2:55
 "Hold On To My Lines" – 2:34
 "Call Me" – 3:55
 "Can't Take The Heat" – 2:56
 "California Dreaming Again" – 3:18
 "Dancing Alone" – 3:05
 "Soiree" – 3:51

References 

2002 albums